Penrith Cricket Club is a cricket club based in Penrith, New South Wales, Australia. They are also known as the Panthers, and play in the Sydney Grade Cricket competition. Penrith are currently under the guidance of Andrew Lamb.

History

Grounds

Howell Oval

The ground was completed on the 8th of September, 1956, it was and still is located adjacent to the football stadium. In 1957, the ground was named Howell Oval after Mr. Bill Howell (cricketer). In 1968, the pavilion at Howell Oval was named the N.A Hunter Pavilion for Mr. Norman Hunter. Primarily used by 1st and 2nd grade for both men's and female's plus Brewer shield, Poidevin-Gray Shield and Green Shield.

Bill Ball Oval

This Oval is in honour of Mr. Bill Ball who was the club president over the span of two seasons. More commonly known as Cook Park, located in St Marys. Primarily used by 3rd and 4th grade.

Rance Oval

Rance Oval is located in Werrington and is primarily used for 5th Grade and Metropolitan Cup team. The ground is named after Thomas. J. Rance. Junior representatives sides for Penrith also use this ground.

Honours

Men's 
Club Championships: 1982/83, 2008/09 & 2015/16
First Grade
Belvidere Cup: 1978/79, 1982/83 & 2018/19
Limited Overs Cup: 1998/99, 2001/02 & 2016/17
Second Grade
Albert Cup: 1992/93 & 1998/99
Third Grade
Mitchell Cup: 2002/03
Fourth Grade
Reid Cup: 1984/85 & 2014/15
Fifth Grade
David Sherwood Cup: 1996/97, 2013/14
Metros/Colts
Metropolitan Cup: 2003/04, 2014/15, 2015/16 & 2018/19 
Nepean DCA-
Third Grade: 1987/88 & 1997/98
Fourth Grade: 1984/85
Fifth Grade: 1987/88
Poidevin-Gray Shield: 1983/84, 2000/01, 2009/10 & 2017/18
AW Green Shield: 1996/97 & 2001/02

Women's
Third Grade: 1989/90 & 1991/92
Fourth Grade: 1995/96
Brewer Shield: 2005/06 & 2011/12
Women's U15: 2019/20
Spirit of Cricket Award: 2008/09, 2011/12 & 2012/13

Men's First Grade Cap Numbers

Women's First Grade Cap Numbers

Representative Players

Club Coaches

Penrith Cricket Club Committee

References
https://westernweekender.com.au/2021/11/lamb-ready-to-make-his-mark-at-penrith/
https://penrithhistory.com/sporting-heritage/cricket/
http://www.womenspremier.nsw.cricket.com.au/

|-

Sydney Grade Cricket clubs
Cricket clubs established in 1973
1973 establishments in Australia
Penrith, New South Wales